Louis Joseph Maria Beel (12 April 1902 – 11 February 1977) was a Dutch politician of the defunct Roman Catholic State Party (RKSP) and later co-founder of the Catholic People's Party (KVP) now the Christian Democratic Appeal (CDA) party and jurist who served as Prime Minister of the Netherlands from 3 July 1946 until 7 August 1948 and from 22 December 1958 until 19 May 1959.

Beel studied Law at the Radboud University Nijmegen obtaining a Master of Laws degree and worked as a civil servant in Eindhoven and for the Provincial-Executive of Overijssel from July 1929 until May 1942 and as a researcher at his alma mater before finishing his thesis and graduating as a Doctor of Law in Administrative law and during World War II worked as a lawyer in Eindhoven from May 1942 until January 1945. Shortly before the end of the War Beel was appointed as Minister of the Interior in the Cabinet Gerbrandy III, the last government-in-exile taking office on 23 February 1945. After a cabinet formation Beel retained his position in the national unity Cabinet Schermerhorn–Drees. After the election of 1946 Beel was asked to lead a new cabinet and following a successful cabinet formation with Labour Leader Willem Drees formed the Cabinet Beel I and became Prime Minister of the Netherlands and dual served as Minister of the Interior taking office on 3 July 1946.

After the election of 1948 Beel failed to achieve a new coalition following a difficult cabinet formation and was elected as a Member of the House of Representatives on 27 July 1948. Beel left office following the installation of the Cabinet Drees–Van Schaik on 7 August 1948 and continued to serve in the House of Representatives as a backbencher. In September 1948 Beel was nominated as the next High Commissioner of the Dutch East Indies serving from 29 October 1948 until 2 June 1949 and worked as a professor of Administrative law and Public administration at his alma mater and the Catholic Economic University from October 1949 until December 1951. Following a cabinet reshuffle he was again appointed as Minister of the Interior in the Cabinet Drees I taking office on 6 December 1951. After the election of 1952 Beel continued his office in the Cabinet Drees II and also became Deputy Prime Minister taking office on 2 September 1952. On 7 July 1956 Beel resigned after his appointment to lead a special commission investigating a political crisis concerning the Royal Family. In February 1958 Beel was nominated as a Member of the Council of State taking office on 1 April 1958. After the fall of the Cabinet Drees III Beel was asked to lead an interim cabinet until the next election and following a successful cabinet formation formed the caretaker Cabinet Beel II and again became Prime Minister of the Netherlands and dual served as Minister of Social Affairs and Health taking office on 22 December 1958.

Before the election of 1959 Beel indicated that he wouldn't serve another term as Prime Minister or not stand for the election. Beel left office a second time following the installation of the Cabinet De Quay on 19 May 1959. Beel continued to be active in politics and in July 1959 was nominated as the next Vice-President of the Council of State serving from 1 August 1959 until 1 July 1972.

Beel retired from active politics at 70 and became active in the public sector as a non-profit director and served on several state commissions and councils on behalf of the government. Beel was known for his abilities as efficient manager and effective consensus builder. Beel was granted the honorary title of Minister of State on 21 November 1956 and continued to comment on political affairs as a statesman until he was diagnosed with leukemia in August 1976 and dying six months later at the age of 74. He holds the distinction as the only Prime Minister to have served two non-consecutive terms after World War II and because of his short terms in office his premiership is therefore is usually omitted both by scholars and the public in rankings but his legacy as a Minister in the 1940s and 50s and later as Vice-President of the Council of State Bank continue to this-day.

Biography

Early life
Louis Joseph Maria Beel was born on 12 April 1902 in Roermond, a town with a Bishop's see in the province of Limburg, in the very south of the Netherlands. He grew up in a predominantly Roman Catholic community and went to school at the famous Bisschoppelijk College (Diocesan College) of Roermond. He graduated in 1920 and found work as clerk-volunteer at the municipality of Roermond. Two years later he became secretary to the Educational Religious Inspector of the Roermond diocese, Monsignor Petrus van Gils. When in 1923 the Roman Catholic University was founded in Nijmegen (presently known as the Radboud University Nijmegen), Monsignor van Gils insisted on his secretary becoming a part-time law-student in Nijmegen. In 1924 Beel began commuting between Roermond and Nijmegen. After obtaining his bachelor's degree in 1925 he found a new job as an administrative assistant in the government of the eastern province of Overijssel. He moved to its capital, the town of Zwolle, and left his place of birth Roermond. During the time he lived in Zwolle Beel got married and his first child, a son, was born. In addition to being a provincial civil servant Beel accepted a part-time lectureship at an institute for professional training, Katholieke Leergangen, and he wrote his first articles on legal subjects.

In 1928 Beel obtained his master's degree in law at Radboud University Nijmegen. Subsequently, he applied for a better job, and managed to find one as a clerk in the municipality of Eindhoven, also in the South of The Netherlands at that time a booming city as a result of the establishment of the Philips group. With his wife, his son and his mother-in-law he moved to Eindhoven in 1929 and lived there for more than fifteen years. Three daughters were born there. Beel's professional career progressed rapidly and in less than one year he became a principal clerk. As he had in Zwolle, Beel proved to be an industrious man. He continued his part-time lecturing at the Katholieke Leergangen, he published regularly in the legal press and in 1935 he obtained his doctorate in law at the Radboud University Nijmegen.

World War II
At the time of his resignation as a municipal Civil servant in 1942, Beel was Director of Social Affairs and Deputy Town Clerk. Beel resigned because he opposed the German Occupation of the Netherlands. To avoid being taken prisoner by the German occupational forces he frequently had to go in hiding. Eindhoven was liberated on 18 September 1944 at the time of the World War II military offensive known as Operation Market Garden. Dutch resistance fighters, massively manifesting themselves immediately after the Germans had gone, saw Beel as one of them. He became the spokesman of a group of prominent citizens in Eindhoven, who had resisted the Germans during the war. The group was not in favour of a continuation of the pre-war political party-lines, with the ever-dominant Anti-Revolutionary Party. In this vein they sent an Address, drafted by Beel, to Queen Wilhelmina, who still resided in London. Beel was urged to accept the function of adviser to the Military Administration (Militair Gezag), the temporary government in the liberated southern part of The Netherlands under Supreme Headquarters Allied Expeditionary Force. In this capacity Beel was invited by the Dutch government in exile to travel to London and to advise on dealing with the war victims. He arrived in London on 1 January 1945. On 10 January he visited at her request Queen Wilhelmina in her English mansion Mortimer. This visit gave a decisive turn to Beel's life.

Politics
The Queen intuitively saw in Beel, a Roman Catholic from the South who ostentatiously had rejected Nazism, the prototype of the patriot and of the sort of "renewed" person she was looking for to replace the members of her war-cabinet, of whom she no longer wholeheartedly approved. Beel was promptly appointed Minister of the Interior in the third Gerbrandy cabinet. This cabinet resigned immediately after the end of the war, in May 1945, to free the path for a new one to be formed by two a liberal, Wim Schermerhorn, and social democrat, Willem Drees. They invited Beel to remain as Minister of the Interior in their cabinet (the Cabinet Schermerhorn/Drees). According to his own words, Beel reluctantly agreed. He moved with his family from Eindhoven in the South to Wassenaar in the West, a villadom close to The Hague, the government's residence.

Post-war parliamentary elections could finally be held in May 1946. In the election campaign Beel voiced the political resistance from the religious and liberal parties against the economic planning and socialism favoured by Prime Minister Schermerhorn and his political supporters. Unlike the British elections of the previous year where the Labour Party gained a decisive victory, in the Netherlands the 'Socialist breakthrough' which had been expected did not materialise in these first post-war elections. The Catholic People's Party) was the big winner, though no party had an overall majority. Queen Wilhelmina requested Beel to form a new cabinet. He became Prime Minister of a 'red-Roman coalition', which he called the 'New Truce', since it was the first cabinet in Dutch history of socialists and Roman Catholics. This Beel-cabinet set the course for the political and economic development of the post war Netherlands.

In social policy, temporary measures were introduced in December 1946 entitling wage-earners to an allowance for the first and second child under the age of 18. The Old Age Pensions Emergency Provisions Act of May 1947 provided means-tested pensions for all persons over the age of 65 regardless of the previous employment record, and the Pensioners’ Family Allowances Act of July 1948 introduced family allowance for those in receipt of invalidity, old age, or survivors’ benefits "according to the Invalidity Insurance Act 1919."

In 1948 parliamentary elections were again required for a constitutional renewal, which was thought necessary to solve the problems emerging in the Dutch East Indies, where the nationalists lead by Sukarno and Hatta had proclaimed the independence of their country immediately after the Japanese surrender. The KVP won again and Beel was asked to form a new cabinet. He might again have become Prime Minister, but he failed to form the broad based cabinet of socialists, Catholic parties and liberals, which he deemed necessary to secure the corrections in the Constitution. Josef van Schaik, a fellow KVP politician, took over and succeeded in forming a broad based cabinet by offering the socialist Willem Drees the function of Prime Minister, Josef van Schaik himself being satisfied with the function of Deputy Prime Minister. Drees appointed Beel High Commissioner of the Crown in the Dutch East Indies (now Indonesia), as a successor to Lieutenant Governor General Hubertus van Mook, a man of proven managerial abilities, who had to resign unwillingly.

The Dutch government in The Hague made several attempts to reach an agreement with the Republic of Indonesia. Beel, stationed in Batavia (now named Jakarta), was not in favour of such an agreement because of his suspicions - later proven to be right - that the new Republic did not want the establishment of a Federal State of Indonesia, as was planned in the Dutch decolonisation policy. Under the auspices of the Security Council of the United Nations an agreement was achieved in May 1949 to hold a Round Table Conference in The Hague in order to prepare the transfer of sovereignty. Beel made efforts to thwart the agreement. However he was unsuccessful and he resigned from his Office of High Commissioner of the Crown.

Beel returned to his home at the end of May 1949 and a few months later he accepted a professorate in administrative law at his Alma Mater in Nijmegen, one of his early ambitions.

On 7 November 1951, Johannes Henricus van Maarseveen, Minister of the Interior, suddenly died. Prime Minister Drees appealed to Beel to return to office. Again reluctantly, Beel accepted Prime Minister Drees' offer. He also held the function of Minister of the Interior in the next Drees-cabinet after the elections of 1952. In July 1956 Beel asked that he be allowed to resign from government to become, as a private citizen, chairman of a committee of three wise men that was requested by Queen Juliana and the Consort Prince Bernhard of Lippe-Biesterfeld to help solve problems pertaining to the Royal Family. The problems were related to faith healer Greet Hofmans, whom the Queen had invited to the royal palace in order to cure her youngest daughter, who had been born half blind in 1947. The renowned German magazine Der Spiegel had accused Mrs. Hofmans of playing a 'Rasputin' role in the Royal Family. Within a month the committee had fulfilled its task by writing a secret report, which banished the sensitive affair from publicity. Three months later Beel was appointed Minister of State, a prestigious title of honour.

In 1958 after an interlude of eighteen months without a public office, Beel was appointed member of the Council of State. Soon afterwards however he was called upon to form his second cabinet - a rump cabinet from December 1958 until May 1959, that had to dissolve parliament and call new elections. After these elections Beel assisted the Roman Catholic politician Jan de Quay in forming a Catholic-liberal cabinet, ending for the time being the 'red-Roman coalition', which had been Beel's own initiative in 1946. The Cabinet de Quay appointed Beel as Vice-President of the Dutch Council of State, the most prestigious office in the Dutch administration, the head of state being the honorary President of the Dutch Council of State

Whereas other political leaders, who had come forward after the war, one by one left the political scene and the 'participation-democracy' of the New Left movement created a new type of politician, Beel retained in the authority of the Council of State a great influence on government. He owed his role to the way he performed his high office as well to his position of confidence with the Royal Family. In various affairs the royals faced, Beel's taciturn way of acting on behalf of the monarchy and his prudent pulling the strings behind the scene as Vice-President of the Dutch Council of State gave him the nickname 'The Sphinx'. The power he derived from both positions christened him "Viceroy of the Netherlands". The authority of Beel and his controlling influence in political circles became manifest when new cabinets had to be formed or cabinet crises had to be warded off. Through the thirteen years of his vice-presidency Beel had a steering hand in nearly every cabinet-formation - including the dramatic formation of the cabinet of the social democrat Joop den Uyl in 1973.

Later life
As from 1 July 1972, at the age of seventy, Beel resigned (prematurely) from his office of Vice-President of the Dutch Council of State. Some years before his wife had died. He retired with his mentally handicapped eldest daughter and her attendant to the quiet village of Doorn. On 11 February 1977 Beel died in the University Hospital Utrecht from leukemia.

References

External links

Official
  Mr.Dr. L.J.M. (Louis) Beel Parlement & Politiek
  Kabinet-Beel I Rijksoverheid
  Kabinet-Beel II Rijksoverheid

 

1902 births
1977 deaths
Catholic People's Party politicians
Deaths from cancer in the Netherlands
Deaths from leukemia
Deputy Prime Ministers of the Netherlands
Dutch academic administrators
Dutch expatriates in Indonesia
Dutch legal educators
Dutch legal scholars
Dutch legal writers
Dutch nonprofit directors
Dutch people of World War II
Dutch political party founders
Dutch public administration scholars
Dutch Roman Catholics
Governors-General of the Dutch East Indies
Knights Grand Cross of the Order of Orange-Nassau
Ministers of Colonial Affairs of the Netherlands
Ministers of General Affairs of the Netherlands
Ministers of Health of the Netherlands
Ministers of Justice of the Netherlands
Ministers of Social Affairs of the Netherlands
Ministers of Social Work of the Netherlands
Ministers of Sport of the Netherlands
Ministers of State (Netherlands)
Ministers of the Interior of the Netherlands
Members of the Council of State (Netherlands)
Members of the House of Representatives (Netherlands)
People from Doorn
People from Eindhoven
People from Nijmegen
People from Roermond
Politicians from The Hague
People from Wassenaar
People from Zwolle
Prime Ministers of the Netherlands
Radboud University Nijmegen alumni
Academic staff of Radboud University Nijmegen
Recipients of the Order of the House of Orange
Recipients of the Order of the Netherlands Lion
Roman Catholic State Party politicians
Scholars of administrative law
Academic staff of Tilburg University
Vice-presidents of the Council of State (Netherlands)
20th-century Dutch civil servants
20th-century Dutch jurists
20th-century Dutch lawyers
20th-century Dutch educators
20th-century Dutch male writers
20th-century Dutch politicians